Ji Hye-ran (born January 3, 1996), better known by her stage name Z.Hera, is a South Korean singer and actress. Z.Hera appeared on the documentary program Human Theater in 2006 as Shaolin Girl when she was 10 years old. She received attention after being the first South Korean singer to appear on the American social site BuzzFeed. She is known for her roles in Moorim School (2016) and Moon Lovers: Scarlet Heart Ryeo (2016).

Early life 
Z.Hera learned Shaolin Kung Fu at the Shaolin Temple since she was in Elementary school. She speaks four languages: Korean, English, Mandarin and basic Japanese. She trained for 5 years to master her dance abilities with the help of Nam Hyun-joon.

Discography

Extended plays

Singles

Filmography

Television series

Web series

Reality show

Music videos

References

External links 
 Z.Hera on Artisans Music
 Z.Hera's Official Fan Cafe
 Z.Hera's Instagram
 Z.Hera's Twitter

1996 births
Living people
South Korean women pop singers
21st-century South Korean actresses
South Korean television actresses
South Korean web series actresses
South Korean female idols
21st-century South Korean singers
21st-century South Korean women singers